WNCO (1340 kHz) – branded Fox Sports 1340 – is a commercial AM radio station licensed to Ashland, Ohio. The station serves the Ashland, Mansfield and Mount Vernon areas, collectively identified as the Mid-Ohio region. The station is under ownership of iHeartMedia, Inc.

Since September 10, 2012, WNCO runs a sports format, airing content from Fox Sports Radio and Premiere Radio Networks. It originally aired an adult standards/oldies music format from Citadel Media's Timeless satellite feed until June 14, 2009, when it switched to an all-talk format.

It is also the flagship station for Ashland University Eagles football.

The station signed on May 18, 1950 as WATG, owned by Ashland Broadcasting Corp. headed by R. S. Burke. It was acquired by Radio Ashland, Inc. on January 15, 1957 and became WNCO two years later.

References

External links

NCO
News and talk radio stations in the United States
Radio stations established in 1950
Ashland Eagles
IHeartMedia radio stations
1950 establishments in Ohio